Johann Michael Söllner (born 24 December 1955), better known as Hans Söllner, is a German singer-songwriter, who sings in Bavarian-German. Throughout German-speaking countries, especially in Bavaria and Austria, he is famous for publicly criticizing the German government and political systems in general to a vast extent. His lyrics are like stories, as they mainly deal with being in conflict with the law and everyday life problems.

Biography 
Johann Michael Söllner was born to a Catholic family in the Bavarian town of Bad Reichenhall on 24 December 1955. He attended school in the district of Marzoll, where, in his teenage years, he decided to grow out his hair in defiance of social convention. From 1970 to 1973, he trained to become a cook, but was eventually unable to find employment; a brief spell of mandatory service in the German armed forces failed to inspire a professional commitment – neither did a subsequent apprenticeship as a mechanic.

Unemployed on and off for years in Munich, Söllner took to music as he taught himself to play guitar and began to write his own songs. In 1979, he had his first live appearance at a small venue in Munich. After winning a singing competition three years later, he was offered a recording contract with the independent label PPM (Powerplay Music Records) and made his debut in 1983 with Endlich eine Arbeit. In 1986, PPM released the album Für Marianne und Ludwig, followed a year later by Wos reimt se scho auf Nicki.

Söllner left PPM for the well-regarded independent label Trikont, based in Munich, on which he made his debut with Hey Staat! (1989). Considered by many to be his greatest album, Hey Staat! established him as a protest singer and an up-and-coming talent in the alternative music scene. In 1989, he recorded the studio album Bayerman Vibration, which was released the following year and turned out to be an instant success. In 1991, Söllner and his band Bayerman Vibration released the album Live!, a record that is no longer being published and has hence become a rarity. In 1992, Söllner released Der Charlie, which is, along with Hey Staat!, thought of as one of his greatest and simultaneously most controversial works to date. Der Charlie includes a long narration of his 1986–1987 trip to Jamaica and its influence on him in terms not only of reggae music and marijuana use, but also politics and religion.

In August 1993, Söllner announced that he was abandoning the Roman Catholic faith and converting to the Rastafari movement; he further declared himself a vegetarian and a pacifist. In 1995, he released the album Grea Göib Roud, a studio record dedicated to a friend who had died. In 1997, he released the studio album a jeda. One year later, Trikont reissued his first three albums (Endlich eine Arbeit, Für Marianne und Ludwig, and Wos reimt se scho auf Nicki), which had gone out of print following the demise of PPM. In the late 90s, Söllner was fighting criminal charges of cannabis cultivation and insulting public officials. He argued that it was his religious right as a Rastafarian to smoke marijuana, but was ultimately fined heavily and faced enormous legal expenses.

In 2000, Söllner returned with 241255, a double album composed of various live recordings from the previous years. A year on, he released Babylon, another live album, which first featured the Austrian reggae band Bayaman'Sissdem. In 2004, he released Oiwei I, his first studio effort in seven years; like his other albums from this era, it features Bayaman'Sissdem. A live CD, Im Regen, followed in 2005. In 2007, Söllner and Bayaman'Sissdem returned with a new studio album, Viet Nam. On 18 November 2011, Söllner released the studio album Mei Zuastand, which features re-recorded songs from his entire career. On 26 October 2012, he released SoSoSo, a studio record that contains new songs.

On 12. October 2018, Söllners new album "Genug" was released. It was the first album that contained new songmaterial since 2012´s "SoSoSo" and the first album since 2000s "241255" on which he recorded all songs only with his acoustic guitar and without his band "Bayaman Sissdem". The only exception is the live version of the song "Rassist", which he recorded with the Dresden-based reggae combo "BANDA INTERNATIONALE" on the Afrika-Karibik-Festival in Wassertrüdingen.

Discography

Albums 
 1983 – Endlich eine Arbeit
 1986 – Für Marianne und Ludwig
 1987 – Wos reimt se scho auf Nicki
 1989 – Hey Staat!
 1990 – Bayerman Vibration
 1991 – Live!
 1992 – Der Charlie
 1992 – Ungehörtes und Unerhörtes
 1993 – Fang ma do o wo ma neilich aufg'heat ham
 1995 – Grea Göib Roud
 1997 – a jeda
 2000 – 241255
 2001 – Babylon
 2004 – Oiwei I
 2005 – Im Regen
 2007 – Viet Nam
 2011 – Mei Zuastand
 2012 – SoSoSo
 2013 – Zuastand 2
 2018 – Genug

References

External links 

  Official Site

1955 births
Living people
Converts to the Rastafari movement
German male musicians
German pacifists
German Rastafarians
German singer-songwriters
People from Bad Reichenhall
Former Roman Catholics